The Fenyes Estate is a historic two-acre estate complex located at 160-170 Orange Grove Boulevard in Pasadena along what was once known as "Millionaires' Row". The Pasadena Museum of History maintains the century-old estate and offers docent-led tours of the Fenyes Mansion, the Curtin House, and the Finnish Folk Art Museum and gardens.

In 1905, Dr. Adalbert Fenyes, a Hungarian entomologist and the first Pasadena doctor to use an X-ray machine, and his wife Eva Scott Muse Fenyes commissioned a two-story house from architect Robert D. Farquhar. Designed in the Beaux Arts manner, the mansion was completed at a cost of $20,325, In 1911, architect Sylvanus Marston of Marston & Van Pelt completed an addition consisting of a studio, conservatory, and laboratory.

Like many of the large old homes along Orange Grove Boulevard, the Fenyes Mansion reflects the opulent neoclassical tastes popular at the turn of the century. Dr. Fenyes' wife, Eva, was an accomplished artist and world traveler who met her husband in Cairo, Egypt.

The estate and gardens were used as sets for a number of early motion pictures for film industry notables such as Douglas Fairbanks and D.W. Griffith. The estate is listed as a Pasadena Cultural Landmark and was added to the National Register of Historic Places  on September 5, 1985.

Marston & Van Pelt also designed the 1915 Curtin House, a smaller French-influenced house on the grounds for Eva Fenyes' only daughter, Leonora Curtin, who inherited the mansion from her mother. Leonora Curtin had one daughter also named Leonora who was known as “Babsie”. A linguist who spent time among the Pueblo Indians, Babsie traveled widely, spending time in Santa Fe and Pasadena until she met Yrjo Alfred Paloheimo, a Finnish diplomat whom she married in 1946.

Paloheimo was Finland's Consul for the Southwest area and the Fenyes Mansion served as the Finnish consulate's office for seventeen years. Paloheimo also established the Finnish Folk Art Museum, a Swiss chalet-style building. Paloheimo and his wife adopted four Finnish children, who together donated the estate to the Pasadena Museum of History in 1970.

References

Houses on the National Register of Historic Places in California
Houses completed in 1915
Buildings and structures on the National Register of Historic Places in Pasadena, California
Museums in Los Angeles County, California
Houses in Pasadena, California
1915 establishments in California